Seething Wells is a neighbourhood in southwest London on the border between Surbiton in the Royal Borough of Kingston upon Thames in Greater London, and Elmbridge in Surrey. The area was historically a waterworks that supplied London with water from the River Thames. Nowadays it is mainly a residential area, with the notable exception of decommissioned filter beds — the Seething Wells Filter Beds — in the northwest part of the area that borders the Thames.

Etymology 
The name is a gradual corruption of the original Siden Wells which appears on maps from the 18th century, recorded as the medicinal spring at Soothing Wells in a time-of-construction guide to the South Western railway and its neighbouring countryside.  It denoted springs — reportedly warm springs of potable water.

Geography 

Seething Wells is considered to roughly consist of any land previously used as a waterworks on the southeast bank of the Thames facing Hampton Court Park. This land lies primarily in Surbiton in Greater London, although a small part of this land extends into Elmbridge in Surrey.

The Seething Wells area is now primarily residential, bordering Long Ditton Recreation Ground on the west side, and the Victoria Recreation Ground to the south. As well as many houses, the residential area contains a hall of residence for Kingston University, and an old waterworks building that has been converted inside into a gym. On the east side is a clock tower in a small area called Electric Parade. A small plot of land inside the residential area is still used for pumping water, operated by Thames Water.

Towards the west end of the Seething Wells riverbank there is a marina. Midway along the riverbank there are 7, approximately 8 metre deep, decommissioned filter beds known as the Seething Wells Filter Beds (or less commonly, the Surbiton Filter Beds). At the southwest end of the filter bed site is a former coal wharf, with a former pump house building on top; near the site's centre there are a few pumps and pipes which are still in use. At the northeast section of the riverbank there is another marina, with Ravens Ait around 20 metres further northeast in the river.

The decommissioned filter beds are within the 0.23 km2 Riverside South Conservation Area which was identified in 2003.

History 
There is no evidence of any substantial early settlement of the area, although a few Neolithic, Bronze Age, and Roman artifacts were discovered during the waterworks' construction. From medieval times to the early 1800s the area is thought to have been home to several springs and wells (giving rise to the name "Seething Wells") that were purported to have healing properties. In 1808 the area was enclosed for the first time, by the Baron King, and by this point had become occupied by around 200 people.

The Metropolis Water Act 1852 prohibited the extraction of water for household purposes from the tidal Thames. The Lambeth Waterworks Company anticipated this by choosing to build their works at Seething Wells in 1847, which were purchased around 1849, and completed and opened in 1852. Another company - the Chelsea Waterworks Company - joined the Lambeth Waterworks Company here, they started construction in 1854 and opened in 1856. The Lambeth Waterworks played a part in John Snow's investigations into cholera; he showed that homes supplied from further downriver by the Southwark and Vauxhall Waterworks Company had a cholera mortality rate 14 times that of homes supplied by Seething Wells, which was upriver and hence had cleaner water.

Despite carrying less disease, the inlets at Seething Wells sucked up too much mud with the water because of turbulence caused by the twin-mouthed River Mole, The Rythe, and the sharp bend in the Thames. The Lambeth Waterworks Company thus built a replacement intake at Molesey, and the Chelsea Waterworks Company followed them there three years later, after attempting to build works opposite Hampton Court. This left the two companies with just water treatment works at Seething Wells, which existed side by side until they were incorporated into the Metropolitan Water Board in 1903, which was in turn incorporated into the Thames Water Authority in 1973. The water treatment works was privatized as part of Thames Water in 1989, and it was mostly decommissioned by Thames Water in 1992 — a pumping station on Simpson Way now supplies the area with water from the Thames Water Ring Main.

In the early 21st century, most of the old waterworks were turned into a residential area, with the notable exception of 7 decommissioned filter beds — the Seething Wells Filter Beds. Several of the old waterworks buildings were converted inside, instead of being knocked down.

The Electric Parade area and the 130 year old Victoria Recreation Park at the edge of Seething Wells were not located inside the actual waterworks.  Electric Parade originated as a row of shops along the pavement (Parade) of a road that used to be called Electric Parade; they were built around 1904-05 when electricity (Electric) first arrived in Surbiton, and were among the first in the area to use this new technology. The original shops all closed and were replaced with new ones within 15–20 years. Later on, the road was renamed to Brighton Road A243, and Electric Parade now refers to the narrow road and area facing the backs of these shops. The clock tower at the northwest end of the road used to have a globe on top, but it was damaged by a V-1 in WWII and replaced with a bell.

Transport 
Seething Wells is served on behalf of Transport for London, via the Electric Parade and Victoria Recreation Ground stops on the K3 bus route, run by London United Busways. There are also the Seething Wells Kingston University Campus, St Leonard's Road, and Cleaveland Road bus stops, run by several other private companies.

The area is also around half a mile from Surbiton railway station.

Additionally, there are passenger ferries just north of the river facing side of Seething Wells.

See also 
 London water supply infrastructure
 Long Ditton
 Surbiton

References 

London water infrastructure
Districts of London on the River Thames
Areas of London
Districts of the Royal Borough of Kingston upon Thames
Thames Water
Surbiton